Chergali is a rural locality (a selo) and the administrative center of Chergalinsky Selsoviet of Romnensky District, Amur Oblast, Russia. The population was 270 as of 2018. There are 7 streets.

Geography 
Chergali is located 22 km north of Romny (the district's administrative centre) by road. Khokhlatskoye is the nearest rural locality.

References 

Rural localities in Romnensky District